A Long and Winding Road is Maureen McGovern's twelfth studio album and was released in 2008 by PS Classics. It is a cover album of songs that were from the 1960s and early 1970s, written by notable songwriters of that era. Inside the album cover includes an essay by Philip Himberg (who is the Producing Artistic Director of the Sundance Institute Theatre Program) that covers Maureen McGovern's making of the album and the growth of the Great American Songbook during the 1960s.

Track listing

Album credits
 Music director/arranger – Jeff Harris
 Special guest appearance by – Jay Leonhart
 Produced by – Jeffrey Lesser
 Co-produced by – Maureen McGovern
 Executive producer – Dan Fortune
 A&R director – Philip Chaffin

Personnel 
 Jeff Harris – piano
 Jay Leonhart – bass
 Lou Marini Jr. – saxophone
 Jeffrey Carney – bass on "Circle Game," "Cowboy," and "By the Time I Get to Phoenix"
 Joseph Passaro – percussion
 Cenovia Cummins – violin
 Suzanne Chaplin – violin
 Debra Shufelt-Dine – viola
 Dorothy Lawson – cello
 Recorded at Avatar Studios and Clinton Recording Studios, February 2008
 Recorded by: Tom Lazarus
 Pro Tools operator: Bart Migal
 Assistant engineer: Tim Mitchell
 Mixed by: Jeffrey Lesser
 Mastered by: Joe Lambert, Trutone Mastering
 Art direction & design: John Costa, New Orleans
 Photographs by: Deborah Feingold
 Additional photos courtesy of: Maureen McGovern

For PS Classics, LLC
 Executive producer: Tommy Krasker
 A&R direction: Philip Chaffin
 Staff engineer: Bart Migal
 Editorial coordinator: Clifton Gutesman
 Assistant to the producers: Robbie Rozelle

2008 albums
Covers albums
Maureen McGovern albums